Sweetognathus is an extinct genus of conodonts in the family Sweetognathidae that evolved at the beginning of the Permian period (298.9 Ma), in near-equatorial, shallow-water seas.

The genus is characterized by pustulose ornamentation on a wide, flat-topped carina. It originated in the earliest Permian as S. expansus from Diplognathodus edentulus.

Sweetognathus forms a species complex.

The genus is named after paleontologist  Walter C. Sweet.

It has been found that recurrent parallel species pairs have occurred throughout Sweetognathus evolution between populations originating in Bolivia, the Mid-Western Unitied States, and Russia. Parallelisms have been found to occur in the denticle morphologies of their platform elements.

Use in stratigraphy 
According to the List of Global Boundary Stratotype Sections and Points, the species Sweetognathus whitei made its first appearance during the Artinskian (some 290.1 ± 0.26 mya), in the Permian of the Ural mountains.
The species Sweetognathus merrelli is near first appearance during the Sakmarian (some 295.0 ± 0.18 mya) in the Permian of Kondurovsky, Orenburg, Russia.

References

External links 

 

Ozarkodinida genera